
Gmina Stawiski is an urban-rural gmina (administrative district) in Kolno County, Podlaskie Voivodeship, in north-eastern Poland.

Villages
Apart from the town of Stawiski, Gmina Stawiski contains the villages and settlements of Barzykowo, Budy Poryckie, Budy Stawiskie, Budziski, Cedry, Chmielewo, Cwaliny, Dąbrowa, Dzięgiele, Dzierzbia, Grabówek, Hipolitowo, Ignacewo, Jewilin, Jurzec Szlachecki, Jurzec Włościański, Karwowo, Kuczyny, Lisy, Łojewek, Michny, Mieczki-Sucholaszczki, Mieszołki, Poryte, Poryte Małe, Poryte Szlacheckie, Poryte Włościańskie, Ramoty, Rogale, Romany, Rostki, Skroda Mała, Sokoły, Tafiły, Wilczewo, Wysokie Duże, Wysokie Małe, Zabiele, Zaborowo, Zalesie and Żelazki.

Neighbouring gminas
Gmina Stawiski is bordered by the gminas of Grabowo, Jedwabne, Kolno, Mały Płock, Piątnica and Przytuły.

References

Polish official population figures 2006

Stawiski
Kolno County